Musalaha (Hebrew:) is a non-profit organization that works towards reconciliation between Israelis and Palestinians based on the Biblical principles of peace, justice, and love. The name Musalaha comes from the Arabic word for 'reconciliation'. The mission statement from their official website states: "Musalaha is a non-profit organization that seeks to promote reconciliation between Israelis and Palestinians as demonstrated in the life and teaching of Jesus. We seek to be an encouragement and facilitator of reconciliation, first among Palestinian Christians and Messianic Israelis, and then beyond to our respective communities."
It also states that Musalaha seeks "to facilitate bridge building among different segments of the Israeli and Palestinian societies according to biblical reconciliation principles." 

Musalaha partners with a number of different organization around the world, such as Reconciliation Ministries in the United States, and Amzi in Germany and Switzerland, as well with local Palestinian and Israeli organizations. Musalaha's Board members are all Messianic Jewish Israeli and Palestinian Christian leaders in Israel and the Palestinian Territories.

History of Musalaha

Musalaha was founded in 1990, when unity among Israeli and Palestinian believers was especially lacking due to the First Intifada. Dr. Salim J. Munayer, an Israeli-Palestinian from Lod, relates how this lack of unity was recognized by leaders from both sides. In response they "founded Musalaha as a vehicle to bring people into the process of Biblical reconciliation". Their vision was to create a neutral space for Messianic Jewish Israelis and Palestinian Christians to meet with each other, and receive training in reconciliation. Musalaha began by taking groups of Palestinians and Israelis on trips to the desert, which thanks to its isolation, is an ideal location for this type of encounter. Munayer articulated this vision when he said, "I would like to try taking groups of people from both sides out into the desert for three days. I believe that when they are away from their normal surroundings, in a situation where they must work together, we can begin to break down the barriers and build a trust relationship." From its small, grass-roots beginning, Musalaha has grown into a thriving, locally and internationally recognized entity, and has developed a large variety of reconciliation-based activities. While not ignoring the divisive political and theological issues such as Theology of the Land, Justice, Israeli settlements, and Palestinian terrorist attacks, Musalaha seeks to bring both sides together and develop friendships, before undertaking the difficult task of discussing them. In the words of Salim J. Munayer,

"As we founded Musalaha we knew that we had to deal with those issues, but also understood that Musalaha had to find a safe forum where people could develop relationships, and then express, exchange, learn, and debate the issues that divide us. Many wanted to deal with the issues right away without understanding the importance of the process: that these issues will be dealt with in proper time and manner, in the context of developed relationships."The strategy for developing these foundational relationships, according to Munayer, was to bring both sides together. "I came to the conclusion that the theology of reconciliation was the best theology to deal with all these issues, and that more than anything else, the Jewish and Palestinian believers needed to be brought together, face to face. Anything less would not work, because of the dehumanization and demonization going on from both sides."

Among the early supporters of Musalaha was Open Doors leader, Brother Andrew. He wrote of Musalaha, "Of all the ministries in Israel, I found myself drawn most to this one. It seemed the most ambitious but also the riskiest. It wasn't an idea promoted by foreign missionaries but was birthed in the local Christian community. It didn't just talk about the problem between Palestinians and Jews. It brought the two sides together and provided a means for them to reconcile."

The Work of Musalaha

Musalaha has developed a number of different projects, from desert encounters to conferences and training workshops, all designed to bring Israelis and Palestinians together. Officially, Musalaha as an organization has no political stance or agenda, however in the words of Salim J. Munayer, "It would be naive to say that Musalaha doesn't have one [a political agenda], because here in Jerusalem we are all involved in politics, as much as breathing or eating. Everything we say and do has political implications...So we do have a political agenda. We want to see nations in the Middle East, and especially the Israeli Jews and Palestinian Arabs, being reconciled by the gospel. What does that mean? Simply, it means to be reconciled to each other."
In order to bring about this reconciliation, Musalaha's list of activities has expanded from desert encounters, to include a variety of other projects. The goal is to expose Israelis and Palestinians of all ages to the message of reconciliation, and to equip them with the tools needed to make this vision a reality.

Children
The process of reconciliation is long and hard, however the earlier it is undertaken, the easier it is to make real progress. For children, learning to understand the "Other" side comes quickly when they have exposure to each other.

Musalaha hosts an annual Children's Summer Camp. This camp is unique in that it brings together Israeli and Palestinian children (ages 9–12) in a friendly, neutral environment. For many of these young children, this camp is their first exposure to anyone from the other side and can be a very formative experience, and have a positive influence on their perceptions of each other.

Youth
Musalaha also focuses on developing the ethic of reconciliation among youth. They organize a Youth Desert Encounter once a year, for around 50 Israeli and Palestinian youth, where they receive training in reconciliation, and have a chance to build relationships with each other. It also involves other activities such as hiking and camel riding. The Youth Desert Encounter takes place locally, either in the Arabah or in the Negev regions of southern Israel.

Young adults
Another annual Musalaha event is Young Adult Desert Encounter, which takes place in Wadi Rum in Jordan. It is similar to the Youth Desert Encounter, however it usually involves discussion on a higher, more intense level as most of the participants are university students, and many on the Israeli side have already completed their mandatory military service. Musalaha views the young adults as an important demographic to reach, because they are the leaders of the future. The focus for this desert encounter remains reconciliation and relationship building.

Women
Musalaha has established a network of women's groups, that bring together Israeli and Palestinian women for fellowship, relationship-building, and reconciliation training. They have a number of annual conferences and seminars that focus on intensive reconciliation training. These women are also encouraged to undertake their own reconciliation activities, as well as humanitarian outreach projects. The focus on women stems from a recognition that they serve as agents of change in their communities, and have significant influence in their capacity as mothers and wives, as well as working members of both the Israeli and Palestinian societies.

Community leaders
The leaders of every community have a great amount of influence over others within their society. Musalaha actively seeks out these leaders, from Israeli and Palestinian communities, in order to train them in reconciliation. The assumption is that they will be effective in transforming the perspective of the people around them in a positive way. Numerous conferences and seminars are organized yearly for Community Leaders, and their families.

Publication
There are many articles and project reports available on the Musalaha website. Additionally, Musalaha has published a number of books:
In the Footsteps of our Father Abraham, Edited by Salim J. Munayer (Jerusalem: Art Plus, 1993) This book is a collection of articles by both Messianic Jewish and Palestinian Christian leaders, on the topic of reconciliation, from its Biblical foundations, to its practical application. It also contains reflections and observations made by participants in different Musalaha events.
Seeking and Pursuing Peace: the Process, the Pain, and the Product, Edited by Salim J. Munayer (Jerusalem: Yanetz Ltd., 1998) This book is a series of articles by Messianic Jewish and Palestinian Christian leaders, such as Naim Ateek and Arnold Fruchtenbaum, as well as others, on the topic of peace and peacemaking. It also offers a section of articles on Musalaha events.
The Bible and the Land: An Encounter, Edited By Lisa Loden, Peter Walker, and Michael Wood (Musalaha, 2000) This book is a collection of articles from a number of different contributors and perspectives, on the Theology of the Land.
Musalaha Worship, عبادة مصالحة, הלל מוסאלחה, (Jerusalem: Musalaha, 2004) This book is a compilation of worship songs in Hebrew and Arabic, collected and published by Musalaha.
You Have Heard It Said, Events of Reconciliation, Jonathan McRay (Eugene: Resource Publications/Wipf & Stock, 2010) This is a collection of stories written about Israeli and Palestinian Musalaha participants.
Journey Through the Storm: Musalaha and the Process of Reconciliation, Edited By Salim J. Munayer (Beit Jala: NOUR Design and Print Company, 2011) This book is a collection of articles, interviews and project reports from Musalaha over the last 20 years.

Musalaha's location
The Musalaha office is in southern Jerusalem, in the Talpiyot neighborhood. Participants in  Musalaha activities and events come from all over Israel, as well as from the Palestinian Territories. Their conferences and seminars take place at various locations around the country, however because it is often difficult to find a place where both Israelis and Palestinians are comfortable, and legally allowed to meet, Musalaha activities often take place in other regional locations such as Jordan, Cyprus, and in Europe.

Musalaha's supporters
As a non-profit, non-governmental organization, Musalaha depends on various charitable organizations worldwide that support its work.

See also
Palestinian Christians
Messianic Judaism

External links
Musalaha - official website
Salim J. Munayer, "Reconciliation: Sharing Living Water in the Desert" from Called and Sent Magazine - Article on reconciliation in 3 parts
Salim J. Munayer, "Peacemaking and the Armour of God" from Christian Mission Society (CMS) - Article on peacemaking
Joshua Korn, "The Limits of Love" from Sight Magazine - Article on Musalaha youth leader training conference

References

Christian and Jewish interfaith dialogue
Non-governmental organizations involved in the Israeli–Palestinian peace process
Peace organizations based in Israel